Seth Barton (December 5, 1795 – December 29, 1854) was an attorney and government official who was active in Alabama and Louisiana.  He served the federal government as Solicitor of the United States Treasury and Chargé d'affaires in Chile.

Biography
Barton was born in Baltimore, Maryland on December 5, 1795, the son of shipping merchant Seth Barton and Sarah Emerson (Maxwell) Barton.  He attended Washington and Lee University, where he studied law and attained admission to the bar.

In 1821 he relocated to Tuscaloosa, Alabama, where he continued to practice law and became involved in the newspaper business.  He apparently served in the militia, in that he was often referred to in correspondence and press accounts as "Colonel", though the exact details of his military service are not currently known.

Barton was elected to the Alabama House of Representatives in 1825.

In 1828 Barton was an unsuccessful candidate for the United States House of Representatives.

Barton moved to New Orleans, Louisiana in 1830, where he continued to practice law as a partner of Judah P. Benjamin.  In 1843 he ran unsuccessfully for the Louisiana House of Representatives, and in 1844 he supported James K. Polk for President, including writing letters to the editor under the pen name John Randolph of Roanoke.

Polk, as President, rewarded Barton with an appointment as Solicitor of the Treasury, where he served from 1845 to 1847.

Barton served as U.S. Chargé d'affaires in Chile from 1847 to 1849.  While at this post he created controversy by marrying a local woman in a Protestant service.  The leaders of Chile's Catholic Church were angered because as a Protestant and a man who had been divorced, they believed Barton to be violating church tenets by marrying Isabel Astaburruaga, who was Catholic.

After leaving office, Barton resumed practicing law in New Orleans as the partner of Pierre Soulé.  He died of yellow fever in New Orleans on December 29, 1854.

References

1795 births
1854 deaths
People from Tuscaloosa County, Alabama
Members of the Alabama House of Representatives
Politicians from New Orleans
Washington and Lee University alumni
American lawyers
19th-century American diplomats
Polk administration personnel
United States Department of the Treasury officials
Ambassadors of the United States to Chile
19th-century American politicians